Ramón David Coronel Gómez (born 31 March 1991) is a Paraguayan footballer who plays for 12 de Octubre in the Paraguayan Primera División.

Career
Coronel plays for Club Nacional. He made his international debut in a match against Cameroon in May 2014.

References

External links

1991 births
Living people
Paraguayan footballers
Paraguayan expatriate footballers
Paraguay international footballers
Paraguayan Primera División players
Cerro Porteño players
Club Nacional footballers
Deportivo Capiatá players
Club Olimpia footballers
Sportivo Trinidense footballers
Sportivo Luqueño players
Vila Nova Futebol Clube players
12 de Octubre Football Club players
Association football fullbacks
Paraguayan expatriate sportspeople in Brazil
Expatriate footballers in Brazil